Mark Keller may refer to:

 Mark Keller (actor) (born 1965), German actor
 Mark Keller (politician) (born 1954), American politician

See also
 Marc Keller (born 1968), French footballer